Víctor Ivo Acuña Velázquez (1966–2007) was a Cuban Communist and  lieutenant colonel in the Revolutionary Armed Forces. In 1983 Acuña Velázquez enrolled in the General Carlos Rolof Military Academy, from which he graduated as a communications engineer. In his military career, he occupied various posts linked to the specialty of communications, and he rose successively in rank until attaining that of lieutenant colonel. Acuña Velázquez was murdered in 2007 when he tried to stop two hijackers of an airplane at José Martí International Airport. He was then awarded the Antonio Maceo Medal of Valor posthumously by Raúl Castro.

References
Granma May 11, 2007.

Cuban soldiers
Cuban communists
1966 births
2007 deaths
Cuban murder victims
People murdered in Cuba
2000s murders in Cuba
2007 murders in North America